Acton-Boxborough Regional School District (ABRSD) is a school district headquartered in Acton, Massachusetts and serving Acton and Boxborough in the Boston metropolitan area.

Schools

Secondary schools:
Acton-Boxborough Regional High School (Acton)
R.J. Grey Junior High School (Acton)
Elementary schools:
Blanchard Memorial School (Boxborough)
Luther Conant School (Acton)
CT Douglas Elementary School (Acton)
Gates Elementary School (Acton)
McCarthy-Towne Elementary School (Acton)
Merriam School (Acton)
Preschool:
Carol Huebner Early Childhood Program (Acton and Boxborough)

Student Information System
PowerSchool, integrated with SRC Solutions' Registration Gateway

References

External links
 Acton-Boxborough Regional School District
School districts in Massachusetts
Education in Middlesex County, Massachusetts
Acton, Massachusetts